Luga may refer to:
Mateo Noriel Luga, Ibanag revolutionary
Luga, Germany, a place in Saxony, Germany
Luga, Russia, several inhabited localities in Russia
Luga Bay, a bay in the Gulf of Finland, Russia
Luga (river), a river in Novgorod and Leningrad Oblasts, Russia
Luga language, alternative name of the Lungga language, a Malayo-Polynesian language spoken in the Solomon Islands
21919 Luga, a main-belt asteroid
Luga (crater), a crater on Mars

See also
Luzhsky (disambiguation)